Three Bewildered People in the Night is a 1987 American drama film directed by Gregg Araki and starring Darcy Marta, John Lacques, and Mark Howell. The film follows three characters through the dissolution of a heterosexual relationship and the possible beginning of a gay one.

Premise
The film revolves around Alicia, a video artist, her live-in boyfriend Craig, a journalist and frustrated actor, and David, Alicia's best friend and a gay performance artist. Through a series of telephone calls and coffee shop conversations, Craig and Alicia split up and Craig and David take tentative steps toward a relationship.

Cast
 Darcy Marta as Alicia
 John Lacques as Craig
 Mark Howell as David

Production
Gregg Araki shot Three Bewildered People in the Night on a budget of $5,000. He shot in black and white using a spring-wound Bolex camera. The film is an example of guerrilla filmmaking, with Araki shooting in unauthorized locations without permits.

Reception
Three Bewildered People in the Night won the Ernest Artaria Award at the 1989 Locarno International Film Festival.

Notes

References
 Levy, Emanuel (2001). Cinema of Outsiders: The Rise of American Independent Film. NYU Press. .

External links
 

1987 films
1987 drama films
American drama films
American LGBT-related films
1987 LGBT-related films
1980s English-language films
Films directed by Gregg Araki
American black-and-white films
American independent films
LGBT-related drama films
1987 directorial debut films
Gay-related films
1987 independent films
1980s American films